Pyrausta decetialis is a moth in the family Crambidae. It was described by Herbert Druce in 1895. It is found in Costa Rica.

References

Moths described in 1895
decetialis
Moths of Central America